Josef Schneider (5 March 1891 – May 1966) was a Swiss rower who competed in the 1924 Summer Olympics. In 1924 he won the bronze medal in the single sculls event.

References

1891 births
1966 deaths
Swiss male rowers
Olympic rowers of Switzerland
Rowers at the 1924 Summer Olympics
Olympic bronze medalists for Switzerland
Olympic medalists in rowing
Medalists at the 1924 Summer Olympics
European Rowing Championships medalists